South Korean cinemas, along with three major multiplex cinema companies, have a number of unique characteristics.

History of movie theaters in South Korea 
In 1902, in commemoration of the 40th anniversary of King Gojong's death under the leadership of the royal family, the Hyopyol-sa theater was opened in Jeong-dong. However, the Hyopyol-sa theater was not meant to be permanent. The Danseongsa theater in Jongno 3-ga was the first permanent theater in Korea, and is the oldest cinema in South Korea. The Danseongsa theater was built in 1907 as a two-story wooden structure and was used for performances such as dances in Buddhist attire and gayageum. It was taken over by Park Seung-pil in mid-1910, and a kino drama with a mix of plays and movies began to be performed. In 1998, the CGV Gangbyeon branch with 11 theaters opened in South Korea, opening the era of multiplex theaters and creating a large-scale movie industry.

Variety of theaters in South Korea

Single theater 
Before the creation of multiplex theaters in the 1980s, most theaters were single-theaters. In 1903, the first theater in South Korea, Dongdaemun Activity Photography, was built in the parking lot of Dongdaemun Market.

With the growing popularity of Dongdaemun Activity Photography, the first government-run theater of South Korea, Hyopyul-sa, also began showing films in July 1903. At the theater, visitors could watch a package-style program that featured short films for 5 to 10 minutes and stage performances such as kisaeng dance and pansori.

The first permanent movie theater was Danseongsa, which was built in 1907. At the time of its establishment, it was a place for traditional performances, but it became a permanent movie theater from 1910. In October 1919, it screened the first South Korean-made film, "Fight For Justice".

Single-theaters present in 2019

Cinema M 
It is operated by Daegu MBC, showing only one movie at a fixed time. It is currently built on the first floor of the 16-story MBC building in Daegu and opened on December 1, 2000.

Donggwang Theater 
It was built in 1959, and it can accommodate a total of 283 people.

Gwangju Theater 
The Gwangju Theater is the only theater in South Korea with only one screen. The Aegwan Theater in Incheon, considered the first indoor theater in Korean society, has been transformed into a multiplex, and the civilian theater Danseongsa, which opened for the first time in the Korean Empire capital, was closed. Against this backdrop, Gwangju Theater, which established a corporation in 1933, opened in 1935, and is ahead of its 82nd anniversary as of 2017. It has 862 seats and shows art films, independent films, and movies from around the world that are not shown in general theaters. On the last Wednesday of every month, the cinema shows a film station program including art exhibitions and music concerts as well as watching movies.

Drive-in theaters 
In the 1990s and 2000s, drive-in theaters nationwide became more popular. The first drive-in theater of South Korea opened on April 23, 1994 at Bearstown in Pocheon, Gyeonggi Province. At that time, a large screen measuring 12 meters wide and 5 meters long was installed. In the 1990s, it was said that it was not easy for ordinary people to buy private cars, and that watching movies was considered a sort of luxury date at the time.

Multiplex theaters 
In December 1986, the opening of the three-screen Damoah Theater and Cinehouse 2 Hall in 1987 opened the era of the multiplex theater. Several multiplex theaters have even placed restaurants and shopping centers in their buildings, which is the origin of multiplex cinemas today.

The multiplex began with the CGV Gangbyeon branch. Currently, the three-way system of CGV, Lotte Cinema and Megabox forms most of South Korea's theater businesses.

IMAX 
In South Korea, the first IMAX theater opened in the 63 Building in 1985 and opened later at the 1993 World Expo in Daejeon. As of 2017 there are currently a total of 16 IMAX theaters in South Korea, with the CGV Yongsan branch, the CGV Cheonho branch and the CGV Wangsimni branch having the biggest screens. The IMAX laser tube, which is 31 meters wide and 22.4 meters long, has been installed in South Korea, with the largest-ever multiplex screen and high-resolution laser projection.

4D theaters 
4D cinemas have been created in South Korea at a time when prospects are raised that the era of movie theaters is over with the proliferation of digital devices. CJ 4DPLEX, a CJ CGV subsidiary that introduced the world's first 4D movie theater, has set up and operated 29 theaters nationwide and 196 theaters in 34 countries in January 2016 since it opened its first 4DX theater at CGV Sangam in 2009.

Small cinemas 
In the absence of cinemas in relatively less populated areas, the small theater business was pushed forward. The Ministry of Culture, Sports and Tourism and local governments worked hard to establish small cinemas to enhance the local residents' enjoyment of the film culture and quality of life.

Dolby Atmos theaters 
With the Surround Sound technology developed by Dolby Atmos Institute, each sound in a movie can be controlled individually by adding speakers to the front and ceiling of a general hall sound system. This technology was first introduced for movie theaters in 2012, and MX Hall (in COEX) of Megabox is a representative theater in South Korea. It has installed 69 Meyer speakers for use in Carnegie Hall and Opera House.

ScreenX 
ScreenX is a screen system that utilizes not only the front screen of a movie theater but also the left and right walls as a screen, so surrounded by three screens. It is currently installed on 64 screens in 50 theaters nationwide. It is the world's first multi-face screening system that was co-developed by CGV and the Korea Advanced Institute of Science and Technology (KAIST) in 2013.

Holographic technology 
In South Korea, a huge hologram performance was held in 2014, involving Psy, Big Bang and 2NE1, which was possible because "Klive," a hologram concert hall funded by the Ministry of Science, ICT and Information and Communication and KT, was created. Their performance at the 1,653-square-meter hologram concert hall was a combination of colorful dance performances and a 270-degree view media facade, giving audiences even greater enjoyment.

Art theaters 
It is a type of theater that screens art, diversity and independent films. However, the number is gradually decreasing because of large theaters such as multiplexes. Therefore, it mainly screens independent films, art films and third world films. Various multiplex brands also operate art film theaters. In 2014, CGV also launched CGV Art House, a brand dedicated to independent and artistic films. Lotte Cinema operates Arte Classic.

Silver Cinema (1969) 
Silver Cinema is a movie theater in Seoul designed to create a space for the elderly.

Cinema for Silver 'Hollywood' 
It is located in Jongno, which has been described as the center of politics, culture and commerce since the Joseon Dynasty. It maintains a ticket price of 2,000 won for senior citizens over age 55. The cinema shows movies that the elderly might have seen when they were young. During the weekend, popular singers such as Jeon Yeong-rok, Jeon Won-ju and Hyun-mi perform, helping the elderly to dance and enjoy themselves.

Myounghwa Cinema 
Myounghwa Cinema is the only silver theater in Gyeonggi Province, which was built by the local government.

Theater culture in South Korea

Culture Day 
Culture Day is a day that provides various benefits on the last Wednesday (including the corresponding week) of every month so that people can easily access the culture in their daily lives. On cultural days, more than 2,000 cultural facilities across the country, including movie theaters, performance halls, museums, art galleries and cultural assets, can be enjoyed at a discount or for free.

Theater snacks 

Based on data from 2014, the prices of popcorn and soda at the three major multiplexes are the same. The original popcorn M size and L size are 4,500 won and 5,000 won, respectively, while soda M and L size are 2,000 won and 2,500 won, respectively. The price of the combo set (popcorn L-size + two drinks M-size) was 8,500 won at the three major multiplexes.

Beer 
Among the three movie theaters, Lotte Cinema is the only one that doesn't sell beer.

Megabox sells Asahi draft beer for 8,000 won per glass. The combo menu, which offers two cups of Asahi draft beer and one of the nachos, squid and hot dogs, is priced at 18,000 won.

CGV sells Hite draft beer for 3,500 won per glass, and the combo menu, which allows users to choose between nacho, grilled squid with butter and popcorn, including two Hite draft beer and almonds, is priced at 9,500 won.

Various snacks 

Megabox sells a variety of items, including "S-Potato" with fried and seasoned potatoes, "Chicken & Chips" made with fried chicken and "Curry Wurster" with curry powder on top of baked sausages.

Some CGVs sell a variety of popcorn in addition to regular popcorn. Among them, the Gourmet Popcorn is a menu made by Le Cordon Bleu's chef and has four types: Creamy Caramel, Real Cheese, Caramel & Cheese Mix and White Berry.

References 

Cinemas in South Korea